Thad George Weber (born September 28, 1984) is a former American professional baseball pitcher and current major league scout. He had appeared in Major League Baseball (MLB) with the Detroit Tigers, San Diego Padres and Toronto Blue Jays as well as in the KBO League for the NC Dinos.

Professional career

Detroit Tigers
On August 22, 2009, Weber tossed the Erie SeaWolves' first no-hitter in almost 14 years. Weber faced two batters over the minimum, struck out a career-high 10, and threw only 88 pitches en route to the historic achievement.

Weber was called up by the Detroit Tigers on April 21, 2012, and made his major league debut the next day against the Texas Rangers. The Rangers won 3-2 in 11 innings. He was optioned back to the minor leagues by Detroit on April 26, 2012, after making two appearances.

San Diego Padres
In August 2012, Weber was signed by the San Diego Padres.

The Padres designated Weber for assignment on May 17, 2013.

Toronto Blue Jays
On May 19, the Toronto Blue Jays claimed Weber off waivers, and optioned him to the Triple-A Buffalo Bisons. Weber was recalled by the Blue Jays on May 25. Weber was optioned back to the Buffalo Bisons by the Blue Jays on May 28. He was recalled on June 9, and then returned to Buffalo after that day's game. On August 13, Weber was recalled again by the Blue Jays to replace Josh Johnson, who was placed on the 15-day disabled list. Weber was optioned back to Buffalo on August 19, but was expected to be activated as the 26th player for the doubleheader against the New York Yankees on August 20.

NC Dinos
On December 11, 2013, he was released by the Blue Jays and signed with the NC Dinos of the Korea Baseball Organization.

Second Stint With Tigers
On January 20, 2015, the Detroit Tigers signed Weber to a minor-league contract. During the 2015 season, Weber started 27 games for the Toledo Mud Hens and had a 6–10 record with a 4.19 ERA and 105 strikeouts.

On December 11, 2015, Weber signed a minor-league contract with the Detroit Tigers. Weber spent the 2016 season shuffling between the Toledo Mud Hens and the Erie SeaWolves, the triple-A and double-A minor league affiliates of the Detroit Tigers, respectively. On January 10, 2017, Weber signed a minor-league contract with the Tigers. He was released on March 25, 2017.

Colorado Rockies
On May 12, 2017, Weber signed a minor league deal with the Colorado Rockies. He was released on November 1, 2017.

Personal info
Thad Weber has a degree in Biological Sciences, graduating on May 10, 2008. 

He missed the UL-Lafayette series, as his wife Megan gave birth to their daughter, Babe, in 2008. He also has 2 sons, Gehrig, born in 2010, Teddy, born in 2013, and a daughter Wynn, born in 2019.

References

External links

 Minor League Stats
 Huskers.com Bio
Korea Baseball Organization

1984 births
Living people
American expatriate baseball players in Canada
American expatriate baseball players in South Korea
Baseball pitchers
Baseball players from Nebraska
Buffalo Bisons (minor league) players
Detroit Tigers players
Erie SeaWolves players
Gulf Coast Tigers players
KBO League pitchers
Lakeland Flying Tigers players
Leones del Caracas players
American expatriate baseball players in Venezuela
NC Dinos players
People from Seward County, Nebraska
Peoria Javelinas players
San Diego Padres players
Toledo Mud Hens players
Toronto Blue Jays players
Tucson Padres players
West Michigan Whitecaps players
People from Friend, Nebraska
Nebraska Cornhuskers baseball players